Paul Donald Kemp Jr. (April 21, 1947 – ca. November 16, 1982) was an American advertising executive from New York who disappeared in mysterious circumstances in a remote part of Wyoming in November 1982. He remained missing until his remains were discovered in 1986, a short distance from where his car was found abandoned four years previously.

Background 
Kemp was working in advertising on Madison Avenue in New York City when a traffic accident left him with debilitating injuries that took him several years to recover from. He decided to leave the rat race and embark on a fresh start in a mountain cabin in the Jackson Hole valley in Wyoming.

Last known movements 
Kemp left New York in September 1982 and drove to Wyoming in his Chevrolet Blazer. On November 15, 1982, the day before he disappeared, he visited a museum in Cheyenne, where he stayed for around two hours and did not speak to anyone. Upon leaving the museum, he left behind his briefcase, which contained his diaries, address book, traveler's checks and glasses needed for driving.

Vehicle discovered 
On the morning of November 16, 1982, Kemp's car was found abandoned with its engine still running, on a ramp off I-80,  from the nearest town. The car was so full of belongings that there would have been no space for anyone except the driver. A single pair of footprints in the snow led investigators six miles into the wilderness to a barn, where they found a pile of sticks arranged to start a fire, and three of Kemp's socks. There were no footprints leading away from the barn, but Kemp was nowhere to be found. Nearby, investigators found a duffel bag containing laundry soap, clothes and a teapot, all of which belonged to Kemp.

Due to the solitary set of footprints, the lack of space for anyone else in the car, and the featureless terrain which should have enabled searchers to easily spot a human being, investigators believed from the outset that Kemp had either disappeared of his own volition and did not want to be found, or was mentally unstable. Deputy Rod Johnson stated: "I felt the guy was disorientated, and I felt that he didn't want to be found. If he would've wanted to be found, he would have heard the aircraft, could have waved his arms, got our attention, gone up to a ridge, anywhere, and been sighted."

Three days after Kemp's disappearance, there was a blizzard and the search was called off. Everyone involved in the search agreed that if Kemp was in the area and not already dead, he would have died in the blizzard.

Mysterious phone calls 
Several months after Kemp disappeared, Judy Aiello, a close friend of his from New York, returned home from an extended vacation to find six messages on her answering machine featuring a voice that she was certain was Kemp's, although the caller never stated his name. The caller sounded panicked and read out a number, urging Aiello to call him back. She did so the next day: a man answered and Aiello asked if Don was there. The man replied "Yes," then almost immediately said, "No". Aiello asked the man if he could ask Don to call her back; the man replied "Yeah" and hung up. Aiello never received a call back.

Aiello informed Kemp's mother, Mary, who in turn informed the authorities. They traced the calls to a rented trailer in Casper, Wyoming, occupied by a man named Mark Dennis. Dennis denied making the calls and of ever having met Don Kemp. He suggested that either someone else used his telephone without his knowledge, or that the telephone company made a mistake about the number used to call Aiello. He agreed to a polygraph test and authorities described him as cooperative, and were satisfied that he was not involved in Kemp's disappearance.

Mary Kemp disagreed with the police's opinion on Dennis and traveled to Wyoming to question him herself. Dennis refused to speak to Mary Kemp and hired an attorney, before abruptly moving away from Casper three weeks after he was initially questioned by the police.

Remains discovered 
Kemp's decomposed remains were discovered in 1986 by hunters a few miles from where his car was found. The autopsy showed no signs of foul play, and the authorities are satisfied that he walked into the wilderness voluntarily and died in or before the blizzard in the immediate aftermath. However, it remains a mystery as to how Kemp's body was not found during the initial search, as his body was located in a clearly visible place that had already been searched.

Sightings and other theories 
Mary Kemp never accepted the findings and claimed up until her death in 2014 that her son was murdered by Mark Dennis.

The telephone calls remain a mystery, as Judy Aiello's number was unlisted. Theories on online forums have surmised that someone found Kemp's address book that he had left at the museum in Cheyenne, and phoned Aiello as a prank, while others have suggested that Kemp may have been abducted upon leaving the museum, explaining why Aiello was convinced that it was Kemp's voice on the voicemail messages.

In addition, two separate sightings of Kemp were reported in Casper in the months following the believed time of his death. One sighting was at an Abraham Lincoln exhibition and the other was at a bar.

Media coverage 
Kemp's case was covered in the first-ever episode of long-running investigative show Unsolved Mysteries on 20 January 1987.

See also
List of solved missing person cases
List of unsolved deaths

References 

1980s missing person cases
Deaths by person in Wyoming
Death conspiracy theories
Deaths from hypothermia
Formerly missing people
Missing person cases in Wyoming
Unsolved deaths in the United States